Sankrail is a village in the Sankrail CD block in the Jhargram subdivision of the Jhargram district in the state of West Bengal, India.

Geography

Location

Jhargram subdivision, the only one in Jhargram district, shown in the map alongside, is composed of  hills, mounds and rolling lands. It is rather succinctly described in the District Human Development Report, 2011 (at that time it was part of Paschim Medinipur district), “The western boundary is more broken and picturesque, for the lower ranges of the Chhotanagpur Hills line the horizon, the jungle assumes the character of forest, and large trees begin to predominate. The soil, however, is lateritic, a considerable area is unproductive, almost uninhabited, especially in the extreme north-west where there are several hills over 1000 feet in height. The remainder of the country is an almost level plain broken only by the sand hills.”3.48% of the population lives in urban areas and 96.52% lives in the rural areas. 20.11% of the total population belonged to scheduled castes and 29.37% belonged to scheduled tribes.

Demographics
According to the 2011 Census of India, Sankrail had a total population of 491 of which 238 (48%) were males and 253 (52%) were females. Population in the age range 0-6 years was 33. The total number of literate persons in Sankrail was 324 (65.99% of the population over 6 years).

Civic administration

Police station
Sankrail police station has jurisdiction over Sankrail  CD block.

Sankrail police station was stormed by a group of Maoists in October 2009. While Atindranath Dutta, the officer-in-charge, was abducted, held captive for a few days and subsequently released in exchange for the release of tribal women held by the police, two police personnel were killed.

References

Villages in Jhargram district